The Treaty of Tolentino was a peace treaty between Revolutionary France and the Papal States, signed on 19 February 1797 and imposing terms of surrender on the Papal side. The signatories for France were the French Directory's Ambassador to the Holy See, François Cacault, and the rising General Napoleon Bonaparte and opposite them four representatives of Pius VI's Curia. 
 
It was part of the events following the invasion of Italy in the early stages of the French Revolutionary Wars. Having defeated the Austrians at the Battle of Mantua, at the Arcola Bridge and in the Battle of Rivoli, Napoleon had no more enemies in northern Italy and was able to devote himself to the Papal States. Following nine months of negotiations between France and the Papal States, in February 1797 9,000 French soldiers invaded the Papal Romagna Region, leaving the Pope no choice but to accept the French terms.

Terms

The treaty added 15 million livre to the indemnity of 21 millions extracted from the Papal States at the preceding armistice signed at Bologna—36 million in all. 

In addition, the papal city of Avignon and its territory, the Comtat Venaissin, which had been occupied by French forces at an early stage of the Revolution, were formally ceded to France - putting a definite end to half a millennium of Papal rule. 

The Romagna region - as noted, already invaded by the French - was also ceded by the Papal States and included in the newly created Cisalpine Republic. 

The treaty also formalized the confiscation of artistic treasures from the Vatican. Over a hundred paintings and other works of art were to go to the Louvre  in Paris. The French commissioners reserved the right to enter any building, public, religious or private, to make their choice and assessment of what was to be taken to France. This part of the treaty was extended to apply to all of Italy in 1798 by treaties with other Italian states. 

Other conditions imposed on the Papal States included a compensation to the family of the journalist Hugh de Basseville, killed by a crowd in Rome for having allegedly "insulted the Pope", and giving consent to the stationing of French troops in Ancona until the end of the war.

Criticism

Of the French terms, the confiscation of artistic works - or, as many considered it, theft and plunder - came under criticism and its legitimacy questioned. Among the fiercest opponents was Quatremère de Quincy who in 1796 wrote a pamphlet, Letters in Miranda, in which he affirmed the strong relationship between a work of art and  the place in which it was intended, asserting that "eradicating the context in which the work was created irreparably impairs its legibility". 

Of the confiscated works of art, a marble copy of a bronze statue of Lucius Junius Brutus remains in Paris. However, most of the works were restored after Napoleon's fall, and the main works are now located in the Vatican Gardens in Rome. The bronze statue of Lucius Junius Brutus has returned to the Capitoline Museums.
 
The treaty did not satisfy the revolutionary Jacobins. Just a year later, the French Army invaded the rest of the Papal States and arrested the Pope, imposing a Roman Republic leading to an immediate new European war.

See also
List of treaties

References
 Filippone, Giustino Le relazioni tra lo stato pontificio e la francia rivoluzionaria: Storia diplomatica del Trattato di Tolentino Part I (1961) Part II (1967) The standard modern treatment.

Tolentino
Tolentino
Art and cultural repatriation
1797 in Italy
1797 in France
1797 treaties
Tolentino
Tolentino
Tolentino
History of le Marche